The Duke of Edinburgh is a Grade II listed public house at 204 Ferndale Road, Brixton, London, SW9 8AG.

It was built in 1936–37 for Truman's Brewery, and designed by their in-house architect A. E. Sewell.

It was Grade II listed in 2015 by Historic England.

References

Pubs in the London Borough of Lambeth
Grade II listed pubs in London
Grade II listed buildings in the London Borough of Lambeth